Fc receptor-like A is a protein that in humans is encoded by the FCRLA gene.

Receptors for the Fc fragment of IgG, or FCGRs (see MIM 146790), are cell surface glycoproteins of the Ig superfamily (IgSF). These receptors mediate phagocytosis of IgG-coated pathogens and promote activation of effector cells, leading to inflammatory responses and antibody-mediated cellular cytotoxicity. All FCGR genes map to human chromosome 1. Additional genes in this region, including FREB, encode FCGR homologs that are selectively expressed in B cells and may be implicated in B-cell development and lymphomagenesis.[supplied by OMIM]

References

Further reading

Fc receptors